The Sea of Faith Network is an organisation with the stated aim to explore and promote religious faith as a human creation.

History
The Sea of Faith movement started in 1984 as a response to Don Cupitt's book and television series, both titled Sea of Faith. Cupitt was educated in both science and theology at the University of Cambridge in the 1950s, and is a philosopher, theologian, Anglican priest, and former Dean of Emmanuel College, Cambridge. In the book and TV series, he surveyed western thinking about religion and charted a transition from traditional realist religion to the view that religion is simply a human creation.

The name Sea of Faith is taken from Matthew Arnold's nostalgic mid-19th century poem "Dover Beach", in which the poet expresses regret that belief in a supernatural world is slowly slipping away; the "sea of faith" is withdrawing like the ebbing tide.

Following the television series, a small group of radical Christian clergy and laity began meeting to explore how they might promote this new understanding of religious faith. Starting with a mailing list of 143 sympathisers, they organised the first UK conference in 1988. A second conference was held in the following year shortly after which the Sea of Faith Network was officially launched. Annual national conferences have been a key event of the network ever since.

Organisation
The Sea of Faith Network is a loose network rather than a formal religious organisation. It holds national and regional conferences and promotional events each year. There is an active network of local groups who meet regularly for discussion and exploration.

The group's magazine Sofia is published quarterly in the United Kingdom. The group also maintains a web site and an on-line discussion group.

Currently there are national networks in the UK, New Zealand and Australia with scattered membership in the USA, Northern Ireland, South Africa, France and The Netherlands. The world-wide membership, as of 2004, stood at about 2,000. Each national network is run by a steering committee elected from its members.

Beliefs
The organisation has no official creed or statement of belief to which members are required to assent. Its stated aim is to "explore and promote religious faith as a human creation". In this it spans a broad spectrum of faith positions from uncompromising non-realism at one end to critical realism at the other. Some members describe themselves as on the liberal or radical wing of conventional belief (see liberal Christianity) while others choose to call themselves religious or Christian humanists (see humanism). Some even refer to themselves as agnostic, atheist, or simply nontheist (see Christian atheism).

Sea of Faith possesses no religious writings or ceremonies of its own; many members remain active in their own religion (mainly but not exclusively Christian) while others have no religious affiliation at all.

Philosophy
A number of commentators have identified Sea of Faith as closely associated with the non-realist approach to religion. This refers to the belief that God has no "real", objective, or empirical existence, independent of human language and culture; God is "real" in the sense that he is a potent symbol, metaphor or projection, but he has no objective existence outside and beyond the practice of religion. Non-realism therefore entails a rejection of all supernaturalism, including concepts such as miracles, the afterlife, and the agency of spirits.

Cupitt wrote, "God is the sum of our values, representing to us their ideal unity, their claims upon us and their creative power". Cupitt calls this "a voluntarist interpretation of faith: a fully demythologized version of Christianity". It entails the claim that even after we have given up the idea that religious beliefs can be grounded in anything beyond the human realm, religion can still be believed and practised in new ways.

Founder's influence
Since he began writing in 1971, Cupitt has produced 36 books. During this time his views have continued to evolve and change. In his early books such as Taking Leave of God and The Sea of Faith Cupitt talks of God alone as non-real, but by the end of the 1980s he moved into postmodernism, describing his position as empty radical humanism: that is, there is nothing but our language, our world, and the meanings, truths and interpretations that we have generated. Everything is non-real, including God.

While Cupitt was the founding influence of Sea of Faith and is much respected for his work for the network, it would not be true to say that he is regarded as a guru or leader of Sea of Faith. Members are free to dissent from his views and Cupitt himself has argued strongly that Sea of Faith should never be a fan club. Both Cupitt and the network emphasise the importance of autonomous critical thought and reject authoritarianism in all forms.

Criticism 
Alvin Platinga called the movement "an amiable sort of dottiness". Anthony Campbell also pointed to the contradictions in Cupitt's intellectual project. At once destroying the tenets of Christianity and then claiming to be a "non-realist" Christian seemed to Campbell to be the same as being an atheist.

See also
 Lloyd Geering

References

Bibliography
The Sea of Faith, Don Cupitt, BBC Books, 1984, Cambridge University Press 1988 edition: 
God in Our Hands, Graham Shaw, SCM, 1987
God in Us, Antony Freeman, SCM, 1993
Faith in Doubt: Non-realism and Christian Belief, David Hart, Mowbrays, 1993
A Reasonable Faith: Introducing Sea of Faith Network, David Boulton, Sea of Faith, 1996
Agenda for Faith, Stephen Mitchell, Sea of Faith, 1997
Emptiness & Brightness, Don Cupitt, Polebridge Press, 2001
God in the Bath: relaxing in the everywhere presence of God, Stephen Mitchell, O Books, 2006, 
Odyssey on the Sea of Faith: The Life and Writings of Don Cupitt, Nigel Leaves, Polebridge Press, 2004, 
Surfing on the Sea of Faith: The Ethics and Religion of Don Cupitt, Nigel Leaves, Polebridge Press, 2005,

External links
Sea of Faith (United Kingdom)
Sea of Faith (New Zealand)
Sea of Faith (Australia)
Sofia, the bi-monthly magazine of SoF U.K.
"The vicars who don't believe in God" on the web site of the BBC
Interview with Don Cupitt on Philosophy Bites podcast

Humanist associations
Religious organisations based in the United Kingdom
Rationalism
Religious pluralism
Secularist organizations
Nontheism
Interfaith organizations